4-Fluoro-7-nitrobenzofurazan (NBD-F) is a fluorogenic, amine labeling dye that is not fluorescent itself,  but covalently reacts with secondary or primary amines to form a fluorescently labeled product. It and other fluorogenic benzofurans (i.e. NBD-Cl) are used for derivitization in HPLC applications. After the fluorogenic reaction, it can be detected with an excitation wavelength of 470 nm (blue) and an emission wavelength of 530 nm (green), enabling an HPLC limit of detection of 10 fmol.

See also
 Fluorescamine
 FQ

References

Oxadiazoles
Nitro compounds
Dyes
Fluoroarenes